Jonathan Green is a freelance writer. He has written for various science fiction and fantasy franchises, including Doctor Who, Fighting Fantasy, Sonic the Hedgehog, and Games Workshop's Warhammer and Warhammer 40,000 game universes.

Biography
Before becoming a full-time writer, Green was a teacher and deputy headmaster of a school in London.

Green wrote seven Fighting Fantasy gamebooks, and a history of the franchise. Green has written four novels for the Games Workshop Black Library label: Necromancer, Magestorm, The Dead and the Damned, and Iron Hands.  He co-authored several Sonic the Hedgehog gamebooks for Puffin Books with Marc Gascoigne.

Green wrote the first book in the Pax Britannia science fiction steampunk series  Unnatural History published by Abaddon Books, which features a Victorian James Bond-style dandy adventurer called Ulysses Quicksilver.

Bibliography

Non-fiction
 Go Gos Are Go Go (1997)
 Match Wits with the Kids (June 2008)
 What is Myrrh Anyway? (October 2008)
 YOU Are The Hero: A History of Fighting Fantasy Gamebooks (September 2014,  and )
 YOU Are The Hero Part 2: A History of Fighting Fantasy Gamebooks (September 2017)

Fiction
Fighting Fantasy adventure gamebooks:
 Spellbreaker (1993, ; 2007)
 Knights of Doom (1994)
 Curse of the Mummy (1995, ; 2007, ; 2011)
 Bloodbones (2006, ; 2010)
 Howl of the Werewolf (2007, ; 2010)
 Stormslayer (2009)
 Night of the Necromancer (2010)
ACE adventure gamebooks: 
Alice's Nightmare in Wonderland (2015, Snowbooks)
The Wicked Wizard of Oz (2015, Snowbooks)
Neverland: Here Be Monsters! (based on Peter and Wendy, The Lost World, The Time Machine and King Kong) (2019, Snowbooks)
Beowulf Beastslayer (2019, Snowbooks)
'TWAS: The Krampus Night Before Christmas (2019, Snowbooks)
Dracula: Curse of the Vampire (based on Bram Stoker's Dracula, with elements of Nosferatu, Frankenstein, and The Lair of the White Worm) (2021, Snowbooks)
Sonic the Hedgehog gamebooks (with Marc Gascoigne, Puffin Books):
 Theme Park Panic (1995)
 Stormin' Sonic (1996)
List of Black Library books:
 The Dead and the Damned (December 2002)
 Crusade for Armageddon (July 2003)
 Magestorm (February 2004)
 Iron Hands (August 2004)
 Necromancer (February 2005)
 Conquest of Armageddon (December 2005)
 Pax Britannia (Abaddon Books):
 Unnatural History (February 2007)
 Leviathan Rising (March 2008)
 Human Nature (January 2009)
 Evolution Expects (May 2009)
 Blood Royal (August 2010, UK-, US-)
 Dark Side (September 2011, UK-, US-)
 Anno Frankenstein (May 2011, UK-, US-)
Robin of Sherwood Novelizations:
 Robin of Sherwood: The Knights Of The Apocalypse. (2016 )

References

External links
 
 

British gamebook writers
20th-century British novelists
21st-century British novelists
Living people
Fighting Fantasy
British male novelists
20th-century British male writers
21st-century British male writers
1971 births